Kunkas (Qunqaś) is a rural locality (a village) in Chebenlinsky Selsoviet, Alsheyevsky District, Bashkortostan, Russia. The population was 31 as of 2010. There is 1 street.

Geography 
Kunkas is located 39 km south of Rayevsky (the district's administrative centre) by road. Ilchigulovo is the nearest rural locality.

References 

Rural localities in Alsheyevsky District